Cortinarius thiersii is a basidiomycete fungus of the genus Cortinarius native to North America.

See also
List of Cortinarius species

References

External links

verecundus
Fungi of North America
Fungi described in 1977
Taxa named by Alexander H. Smith